Sailor Victory is a short OVA series by Katsuhiko Nishijima. The two stories in the series feature a superhero heroine team that use mechanized robots as a local crime-fighting unit. Sailor Victory is a spinoff of another 2 part OVA series called , which is also by the same director. The OVA Graduation is related to a video game of the same name. Sailor Victory was produced by Bandai Visual and released in 1995, since then the title was licensed for release in North America by Anime Works.

Plot

Cast

Additional voices 
English: Andrew Masset, Bill Flaman, Daniel Richani, David Pickelsiemer, Edwin Holt, Pam McChino, Paul Johnson, Robin Robertson, Scott Bailey, Scott Simpson, Shaun O'Rourke

Release

Reception
The English language adaptation has received various reviews from media that specialize in the area. Anime News Network gave the series a "B" rating and compares it to the Sakura Wars franchise. In the review ANN stated that the series was faster in pacing, and surprisingly good when it comes to the humor. They gave a sole minus to the series when it comes to originality.

References

External links

Anime Works
Bandai Visual
Comedy anime and manga
Mecha anime and manga
Studio Fantasia
Superheroes in anime and manga